Corley may refer to the following communities in West Virginia:
Corley, Barbour County, West Virginia
Corley, Braxton County, West Virginia